D200 is a state road connecting Plovanija border crossing and Buje, as well as A9 motorway Umag interchange via Ž5002 county road. The road is 7.6 km long.

The road also provides a connection to Kaštel border crossing via D510 and D21 state roads.

The road, as well as all other state roads in Croatia, is managed and maintained by Hrvatske ceste, state owned company.

Traffic volume 

Traffic is regularly counted and reported by Hrvatske ceste, operator of the road. Substantial variations between annual (AADT) and summer (ASDT) traffic volumes are attributed to the fact that the road connects Plovanija border crossing to Slovenia and A9 motorway carrying substantial tourist traffic to Istria, a major touristic destination.

Road junctions and populated areas

Sources

State roads in Croatia
Transport in Istria County